The 2016 United States Senate election in Indiana was held on November 8, 2016, to elect a member of the United States Senate to represent the State of Indiana. The election was held alongside the presidential election and 2016 Indiana elections.

Republican incumbent Dan Coats, who served in the Senate since 2011 and previously from 1989 to 1999, ultimately chose to not seek reelection. U.S. Representative Todd Young won the May 3 Republican primary to succeed him, with former U.S. Representative Baron Hill winning the Democratic nomination. However, Hill withdrew from the race on July 11, with former Senator Evan Bayh entering the race to regain the seat, which he held from 1999 to 2011. 

The Indiana Democratic Party formally chose Bayh as Hill's replacement on July 22. Following his entry, Bayh was initially seen as the frontrunner in the race. However, during the campaign, he faced heavy criticism over his post-Senate career as a lobbyist, as well as questions about his residency in the state. Young ultimately won by a comfortable margin, defeating Bayh in the general election by 10 points.

Background 
Republican Senator Dan Coats, who had served in the Senate since 2011, and previously from 1989 to 1999, stated that he planned to run for re-election, but in March 2014 his chief of staff said that Coats "has decided not to decide whether to run again until after the [2014] midterm elections". 

On March 24, 2015, Coats announced that he would not run for re-election, citing that he would be of advanced age (just under 80 years old) by the end of the 2017–2023 term, should he complete it.

Republican primary

Candidates

Declared 
 Marlin Stutzman, U.S. Representative and candidate for the U.S. Senate in 2010
 Todd Young, U.S. Representative

Withdrawn 
 Kevin Grant, financial consultant and candidate for IN-04 in 2014 (running for IN-04)
 Eric Holcomb, Senator Coats' chief of staff and former chairman of the Indiana Republican Party (appointed and ran for Lieutenant Governor before replacing Mike Pence as the nominee for Governor)

Declined 
 Greg Ballard, former mayor of Indianapolis
 Jim Banks, state senator (running for IN-03)
 Brian Bosma, Speaker of the Indiana House of Representatives
 Susan Brooks, U.S. Representative and former United States Attorney for the Southern District of Indiana (running for re-election)
 Larry Bucshon, U.S. Representative (running for re-election)
 Dan Coats, incumbent U.S. Senator
 Mitch Daniels, president of Purdue University and former governor of Indiana
 Mike Delph, state senator
 Richard Lugar, former U.S. Senator
 Jim Merritt, state senator
 Luke Messer, U.S. Representative (running for re-election)
 Mike Pence, Governor of Indiana and former U.S. Representative (running for Vice President of the United States)
 Todd Rokita, U.S. Representative and former secretary of state of Indiana (running for re-election)
 Jackie Walorski, U.S. Representative (running for re-election)
 Greg Zoeller, Indiana Attorney General (running for IN-09)

Endorsements

Polling

Results

Democratic primary

Candidates

Declared 
 Baron Hill, former U.S. Representative and nominee for U.S. Senate in 1990 (withdrew after winning primary)

Withdrawn 
 John Dickerson, former nonprofit organization director

Declined 
 Pete Buttigieg, mayor of South Bend
 André Carson, U.S. Representative (running for re-election)
 Brad Ellsworth, former U.S. Representative and nominee for the U.S. Senate in 2010
 Christina Hale, state representative (running for lieutenant governor)
 John Gregg, former Speaker of the Indiana House of Representatives and nominee for governor in 2012 (running for governor)
 Thomas McDermott Jr., Mayor of Hammond
 Bart Peterson, former mayor of Indianapolis
 Glenda Ritz, Indiana Superintendent of Public Instruction (running for re-election)
 Jonathan Weinzapfel, former mayor of Evansville and nominee for Indiana's 8th congressional district in 1996

Endorsements

Results

Democratic State Central Committee selection 
On July 11, 2016, CNN's Tom LoBianco announced that Bayh would enter the race to regain his old Senate seat and Hill would drop out and withdraw his name from the November ballot. Hill soon after released a statement formally dropping out of the race saying he did not "...want to stand in the way of Democrats winning Indiana and the U.S. Senate. That would not be fair to my party or my state. And, the stakes are far too high in this election not to put my country above my own political ambitions," without explicitly endorsing Bayh. The first candidate to declare was Bob Kern, a frequent candidate for Congress in various districts around the state. Bayh officially declared for the race July 13. The Indiana Democratic Party's State Central Committee chose Bayh as Hill's replacement, for the general election.

Candidates 
 Evan Bayh, former U.S. Senator and Governor of Indiana
 Bob Kern, candidate for IN-7 in 2012, IN-2 in 2014, and IN-9 2016

General election

Candidates 
 Evan Bayh (D), former U.S. Senator and Governor of Indiana
 Todd Young (R), U.S. Representative
 Lucy Brenton (L)

Debates

Endorsements

Predictions

Polling 
Graphical summary

with Baron Hill

with Marlin Stutzman

Results

References

External links 
Official campaign websites
 Todd Young (R) for Senate
 Evan Bayh (D) for Senate
 Lucy Brenton (L) for Senate

2016
Indiana
United States Senate
Evan Bayh